Yitzhak Apeloig (יצחק אפלויג; born 1 September 1944 in Uzbekistan) is a pioneer in the computational chemistry field of the Ab initio quantum chemistry methods for predicting and preparing the physical and chemical properties of materials. He was the president of the Technion from 2001 until 2009 where the position was handed off to Peretz Lavie. Distinguished Prof. Apeloig currently holds the Joseph Israel Freund Chair in Chemistry and is the co-director of the Lise Meitner Minerva Center for Computational Quantum Chemistry at the Technion. He served as dean of the Faculty of Chemistry from 1995 to 1999, where he was named Teacher of the Year at three occasions.

During his Technion presidency, Apeloig recruited  more than 150 elite scholars and scientists worldwide to the Technion. He also established a number of interdisciplinary research centers such as the Russell Berrie Nanotechnology Institute. He also established the Lorry I. Lokey Interdisciplinary Center for Life Sciences and Engineering. In 2010 was inducted to the American Academy of Arts and Sciences. The same year he also became a recipient of the Frederic Stanley Kipping Award in Silicon Chemistry.

Biography

Apeloig was born in Bukhara, Uzbekistan after his family fled from the Nazis after the invasion of Poland in September 1939. In 1947, when he was three years old, the family immigrated to Israel. He served in the Nahal Brigade and the paratroopers between 1962 and 1964. He studied chemistry and physics at the Hebrew University of Jerusalem, and completed his undergraduate (receiving his BA in physics and chemistry in 1967, and his masters in 1969) and graduate education there, including a Ph.D. in chemistry in 1974. He conducted postdoctoral research at Princeton University with Paul v. R. Schleyer and collaborated with Nobel Laureate John A. Pople. Apeloig joined the faculty of the Technion in 1976 and in 1983 he was appointed professor. He became the dean of the Faculty of Chemistry in 1995 until 2001 when he became the president of the Technion, replacing Amos Lapidot. In 2009 he was followed as President by Peretz Lavie.

Awards

 2011 – Received the Order of Merit (First Degree) of the Federal Republic of Germany from Bundespräsident Christian Wulff
 2010 – Honorary Foreign Member of the American Academy of Arts and Sciences
 2010 – American Chemical Society Fredric Stanely Kipping Award in Silicon Chemistry
 2010 – Alexander von Humboldt – Lise Meitner Senior Research Award 
 2009 – Fellow, American Association for the Advancement of Science
 2008 – Honorary Member, Mexican Academy of Sciences
 2007 – Wacker Silicone Award
 2006 – Honorary Doctorate of Science from the Technische Universität Berlin, Germany 
 2002 – C. A Coulson Lecturer, University of Georgia, Athens, USA 
 2002 – The Israel Chemical Society Prize 
 1997 – Distinguished Teacher Award by the Technion Student Association
 1996 – Granted a Minerva Center in Computational Quantum Chemistry 
 1994–1999 – Alexander von Humboldt – Lise Meitner Senior Research Award 
 1993 – Distinguished Teacher Award by the Technion Student Association 
 1993 – Senior Scientist Exchange Fellow, Israel-Italy National Council for Research and Development
 1991, 1993 – Henri Gutwirth Prize for Excellence in Research by the Technion
 1991, 1999, 2010 – Japan Society for the Promotion of Science (JSPS), Senior Visiting Professor Award 
 1988 – Technion Award for Academic Excellence, Technion (The New England Prize) 
 1986 – Distinguished Teacher Award by the Technion Student Association 
 1986 – Louis Klein Visiting Professorship in Australian Universities
 1985, 1991 – Deutscher Akademischer Austauschdienst (DAAD) Visiting Professor 
 1979 – Deutscher Akademischer Austauschdienst (DAAD) Fellowship 
 1977–1978 – Bat-Sheba de Rothschild Fellow 
 1974 – Yashinski Prize for Distinguished Ph.D. Thesis
 1971 – Prize for Distinguished Student of the Dean of the Faculty of Sciences, Hebrew University
 1965–1967 – Annual Prize for Distinction in Chemistry Studies, Hebrew University

Publication

References

External links
 Technion – Israel Institute of Technology 

Living people
1944 births
People from Bukhara
Soviet emigrants to Mandatory Palestine
Uzbekistani emigrants to Israel
Technion – Israel Institute of Technology
Academic staff of Technion – Israel Institute of Technology
Technion – Israel Institute of Technology presidents
Israeli chemists
Computational chemists
Hebrew University of Jerusalem alumni
Princeton University alumni
Officers Crosses of the Order of Merit of the Federal Republic of Germany
Schrödinger Medal recipients
Israeli people of Polish-Jewish descent